24→24 Music is a 1981 album by Dinosaur L, the disco project of American musician Arthur Russell. Enlisting a variety of musicians, Russell recorded the album in 1979 primarily at Blank Tapes studio in New York. It was released on Sleeping Bag Records, the label started by Russell and Will Socolov, and accompanied by the single "Go Bang! #5."

Background
The album is an improvised composition grounded in disco but characterized by rhythmic shifts every 24 bars, with Russell running the recordings through two 24-track tape recorders set up by producer Bob Blank. The recording featured a large number of musicians, including the Ingram Brothers band. It was recorded at Blank Tapes studio in June 1979, with the exception of "#7," recorded in April at the New York avant-garde venue the Kitchen, where the material was initially performed. Steven Hall later described its first performance: "it was like really hot dance music and no one got it. The idea that Arthur would turn around and bring that music into their venue and present it as serious music was really very challenging to them, and very threatening to them."

Release
The first limited pressing of this record had a hand-made silk-screened cover. Tracks from the album received significant airtime at New York clubs thanks to DJ Larry Levan, a friend of Russell.

The album was reissued on CD in 2007 with bonus tracks, and again as a box-set in 2011 featuring rare full-length remixes.

Reception

AllMusic called the album Russell's "most delightful" work, and described it as exploring "the blurry hinterlands where disco, downtown avant improv, new music, and funk meet no wave playfulness." Following its reissue, Pitchfork stated that the album "falls in a long line of deserved reissues" of Russell's work, and called it "disco at its loosest, warmest, and weirdest". Melody Maker called it "a fluid, constantly shifting piece of music that’s intensely danceable and spacially disorientating at the same time."

Track listing

Personnel
Credits adapted from liner notes.

Arthur Russell – cello (pizz), vocals
Wilbur Bascomb – bass
Mustafa Ahmed – congas (track 4)
Jeff Berman – drums (track 4)
Rik Albani – trumpet
Julius Eastman – vocals, keyboards
Peter Gordon – tenor saxophone
Kent Goshorn – vocals
Butch Ingram – bass
Jimmy Ingram – keyboards
John Ingram – drums
Timmy Ingram – congas
William Ingram – guitar
Jill Kroesen – vocals
Marie-Chantal Martin – vocals
Denise Mercedes – guitar
Rome Neal – percussion, vocals
Larry Saltzman – guitar (track 4)
Ed Tomney – guitar
Peter Zummo – trombone

Production
Arthur Russell – production
Peter Gordon – production (track 1)
Ray Janos – mastering
Mark Grafe – engineer
Janos – lacquer cut

References

1981 albums
Arthur Russell (musician) albums
Disco albums by American artists